Samuel Terry (c. 1776 – 22 February 1838) was transported to Australia as a criminal, where he became a wealthy landowner, merchant and philanthropist. His extreme wealth made him by far the richest man in the colony with wealth comparable to the richer in England. Terry left a personal estate of £250,000, an income of over £10,000 a year from Sydney rentals, and landed property that defies assessment. At his death in 1838 he was worth 3.39% of the colony's gross domestic product, the equivalent today of over $24 billion.

The year and circumstances of his birth are unknown. While working as a labourer in Manchester, England, on 22 January 1800 he was sentenced to transportation to the colony of Australia for the crime of stealing 400 pairs of stockings. He was taken to Sydney, Australia, where he served as a stone cutter. After working several jobs, he earned a farm in 1808. 

On 27 March 1810 Terry married Rosetta (Rosata) Marsh or Madden, née Pracey, who had come free to the colony in 1799 on the ship, The Hillsborough. She was a widow (possibly of convict Edward Madden, and later of Henry Marsh), and she had three children when she married. She was an innkeeper, and on marriage Terry took over her Pitt Street property. He continued to prosper, becoming a trader and became a supplier of food to the government.

By 1820 he possessed significant amounts of property and was a large shareholder in the Bank of New South Wales. There is some controversy about the means he used to acquire his wealth, and he became accused of extortion by his enemies. It was alleged that he brought land owners to his inn, who would become intoxicated and sign away their property in payment of debts. By 1821 he also brought 28 actions to the Supreme Court.

In the 1820s he was wealthy and a public figure. He was also a philanthropist, contributing to local societies and schools. He also worked for the emancipists and, in 1826, became president of the Masonic Lodge. He died on 22 February 1838 following three years incapacitated as a result of a seizure.

The Samuel Terry Public School, Cranebrook is named in his honor.

In 1967 Terry's biography, written by his great-granddaughter Gwyneth Dow, was included in The Australian Dictionary of Biography.

See also
List of convicts transported to Australia

Further reading

"A.L.F"The history of Samuel Terry in Botany Bay : who died lately, leaving a ... fortune of nearly one million Sterling. With an appendix on emigration and transportation to the Australian colonies London : J. Pattie, 1838.
William D. Rubinstein in association with BRW. The all-time Australian 200 rich list Crows Nest, N.S.W. : Allen & Unwin, 2004.

References

1776 births
1838 deaths
Australian philanthropists
Convicts transported to Australia